The Foreign Affairs Council (FAC) is a configuration of the Council of the European Union that convenes once a month. Meetings bring together the foreign ministers of the member states. Ministers responsible for European affairs, defence, development or trade also participate depending on the items on agenda. The configuration is unique in that is chaired by the High Representative of the Union for Foreign Affairs and Security Policy (HR/VP) rather than the member state holding the presidency of the Council of the European Union; there is one exception, when the FAC meets in the configuration of ministers responsible for trade (FAC/Trade), with the presiding member state's minister chairing the meeting. 

At its sessions, the FAC deals with the whole of the EU's external action, including Common Foreign and Security Policy (CFSP), Common Security and Defence Policy (CSDP), foreign trade and development cooperation. A priority in recent years for the FAC, in cooperation with the European Commission, has been to ensure coherence in the EU's external action across the range of instruments at the EU's disposal.

Composition 

The Foreign Affairs Council gathers different representatives at ministerial level depending on the agenda of a certain Council meeting. Normally the foreign ministers of each country, or their representatives (such as permanent representatives, state secretaries etc.), participate. However, in other cases, defence ministers, trade ministers or development ministers participate.

Configurations

History 
The FAC was created in 2009 by the Treaty of Lisbon by splitting it from the "General Affairs and External Relations Council" with the other part becoming the General Affairs Council. The General and Foreign Councils are the only two Councils mentioned in the EU treaties.

Security role

See also
 Gymnich meeting

References

External links
 About the Foreign Affairs Council
 Press releases of the Foreign Affairs Council

Foreign relations of the European Union
Council of the European Union